Mermaid Waters is a suburb in the City of Gold Coast, Queensland, Australia.

Geography

Mermaid Waters is primarily a residential suburb, featuring many homes built along artificial canals and lakes, including the 17-hectare fresh water Lake Hugh Muntz.

Mermaid Waters is serviced by three public transport routes: Surfside Buslines routes 756 (Broadbeach South – West Burleigh), 750 (Broadbeach South – Robina railway station) and 757 (Broadbeach South – Burleigh Heads). The nearest rail station is Robina railway station, linking the Gold Coast with Brisbane.

History
Oxley named the area where he landed "Mermaid Beach". The adjacent area to the west eventually became known as "Mermaid Waters".

Miami State School and Merrimac State High School both opened on 30 January 1979.

The Broadbeach Library (located in Mermaid Waters) opened in 2008.

In the  Mermaid Waters had a population of 11,789 people.

In the  Mermaid Waters had a population of 12,045 people.

Shopping 
There are two small local shopping centres in Mermaid Waters, and a medium-sized shopping centre, Q Super Centre, in the western parts of the suburb, with new retail and commercial developments being established in the adjacent area. Nearby Pacific Fair Shopping Centre in Broadbeach Waters is one of the largest shopping centres in the Gold Coast.

Education 
Miami State School is a government primary (Early Childhood-6) school for boys and girls at 18-36 Oceanic Drive. In 2017, the school had an enrolment of 819 students with  64 teachers (55 full-time equivalent) and 43 non-teaching staff (27 full-time equivalent). The school includes a special education program.

Merrimac State High School is a government secondary (7-12) school for boys and girls at Dunlop Court. In 2017, the school had an enrolment of 1208 students with  103 teachers (96 full-time equivalent) and 57 non-teaching staff (43 full-time equivalent). It includes a special education program.

Amenities 
Albert Waterways Community Hall is at the northern end of the suburb. Immediately adjacent is the Broadbeach Library, which despite its name is located in Mermaid Waters, opposite Pacific Fair. A customer service centre for the Gold Coast City Council is part of this precinct.

Another community hall is located on the grounds of Miami State Primary School.

Pizzey Park Sports Complex hosts a variety of sports and clubs in the southern Gold Coast. Adjacent to the complex is the Miami Olympic Swimming Pool.

References

External links

 

Suburbs of the Gold Coast, Queensland